Baron Darcy may refer to the following baronies:

Baron Darcy of Nocton, created 1299, abeyant circa 1350
Baron Darcy de Knayth, created 1332, presently extant
Baron Darcy de Darcy (also known as Baron Darcy of Temple Hurst), created 1509, extinct in 1635
Baron Darcy of Chiche, created 1551, extinct in 1640; reversion granted 1613, extinct in 1737
Baron Darcy de Meinill, created 1641, extinct in 1778
Baron Darcy of Navan in the Peerage of Ireland, created 1721, extinct in 1733

See also
Lord Darcy (disambiguation)